Egon Franke (11 April 1913 – 26 April 1995) was a German politician and a member of the Social Democratic Party (SPD). He served as Federal Minister for Intra-German Relations from 1969 to 1982 and, for the short period between the breakup of the SPD-FDP coalition on 17 September 1982 and the constructive vote of no confidence on 1 October of the same year, by which Helmut Kohl replaced Helmut Schmidt, as Vice Chancellor of Germany. With a tenure of 14 days he is, as yet, the vice chancellor with the shortest time in office.

References

1913 births
1995 deaths
Federal government ministers of Germany
Vice-Chancellors of Germany
Grand Crosses 1st class of the Order of Merit of the Federal Republic of Germany
Members of the Bundestag 1983–1987
Members of the Bundestag 1980–1983
Members of the Bundestag 1976–1980
Members of the Bundestag 1972–1976
Members of the Bundestag 1969–1972
Members of the Bundestag 1965–1969
Members of the Bundestag 1961–1965
Members of the Bundestag 1957–1961
Members of the Bundestag 1953–1957
Members of the Bundestag 1949–1953
Members of the Bundestag for Lower Saxony